The Cojuangco (Pampangan: [koˈxwəŋku] or [koˈwəŋku]; ;) clan is a prominent Filipino family descended from Co Yu Hwan, who migrated to the Philippines in 1861 from Hongjian Village, Jiaomei Township, Zhangzhou, Fujian. He was commonly called Khoân ko (Brother Khuan) or Khó͘ Khoân ko / Khó͘ Hoân ko (Brother Kho Khuan) among Hokkien Chinese Filipinos, and the latter was Hispanicized as Cojuangco. He adopted the Christian name José Cojuangco ("El Chino" José) in 1865 when he moved to Bulacan.

The Cojuangco clan is among the most powerful and influential families in the Philippines, exercising economic control over several banks (such as Bank of Commerce) and trade houses, notably the sugar trade (Hacienda Luisita and Central Azucarera de Tarlac). The clan has at various time been highly involved in Philippine politics, with several members having entered public office in both local and national positions.

Alphabetical listing of family members 
Benigno Simeon Cojuangco Aquino III, fifteenth President of the Philippines (2010–2016)
Maria Corazon Sumulong Cojuangco Aquino, eleventh President of the Philippines (1986–1992)
Kristina Bernadette Cojuangco Aquino, actress
Eduardo Cojuangco Jr., businessman and politician
José "Pepe" Cojuangco Sr., politician (grandson and namesake of José "El Chino" Cojuangco)
José "Peping" Cojuangco Jr., politician
Mark Cojuangco, politician
Mikee Cojuangco Jaworski, equestrienne and actress
Gilbert Cojuangco Teodoro, lawyer and politician
Josephine Cojuangco Reyes, educator and school administrator
Sophie Albert, actress (granddaughter of Josephine C. Reyes)

References